Apodia is a genus of moth in the family Gelechiidae.

Species
Apodia bifractella (Duponchel, 1843)
Apodia martinii Petry, 1911

References

 , 2010: The gelechiid fauna of the southern Ural Mountains, part I: descriptions of seventeen new species (Lepidoptera: Gelechiidae). Zootaxa 2366: 1-34. Abstract: .

Isophrictini
Moth genera